In addition to the generally accepted taxonomic name Homo sapiens (Latin: "sapient human",  Linnaeus 1758), other Latin-based names for the human species have been created to refer to various aspects of the human character.

The common name of the human species in English is historically man (from Germanic), often replaced by the Latinate human (since the 16th century).

In the world's languages

The Indo-European languages have a number of inherited terms for mankind. 
The etymon of man is found in the Germanic languages, and is cognate with Manu, the name of the human progenitor in Hindu mythology, and found in Indic terms for "man" (manuṣya, manush, manava etc.).

Latin homo is derived from an Indo-European root dʰǵʰm- "earth", as it were  "earthling". It has cognates in Baltic (Old Prussian zmūi),  Germanic (Gothic guma) and Celtic (Old Irish duine).
This is comparable to the explanation given in the Genesis narrative to the Hebrew Adam (אָדָם) "man", derived from a word for "red, reddish-brown". Etymologically, it may be an ethnic or racial classification (after "reddish" skin colour contrasting with both "white" and "black"), but Genesis takes it to refer to the reddish colour of earth, as in the narrative the first man is formed from earth.

Other Indo-European languages name man for his mortality, *mr̥tós meaning "mortal", so in Armenian mard,  Persian mard,  Sanskrit marta and Greek βροτός meaning "mortal; human".
This is comparable to the Semitic word for "man", represented by  Arabic insan  (cognate with Hebrew ʼenōš ), from a root for "sick, mortal".
The Arabic word  has been influential in the Islamic world, and was adopted in many Turkic languages. The native Turkic word is kiši.

Greek  (anthropos) is of uncertain, possibly pre-Greek origin.
Slavic čelověkъ also is of uncertain etymology.

The Chinese character used in East Asian languages is 人, originating as a pictogram of a human being. The reconstructed Old Chinese pronunciation of the Chinese word is /ni[ŋ]/. A Proto-Sino-Tibetan r-mi(j)-n gives rise to Old Chinese /*miŋ/, modern Chinese 民 mín "people" and to Tibetan མི mi "person, human being".

In some tribal or band societies,
the local endonym is indistinguishable from the word for "men, human beings". 
Examples include 
Ainu: ainu,
Inuktitut: inuk, 
Bantu: bantu,  
 (etc.),
possibly in Uralic: Hungarian magyar, Mansi mäńćī, mańśi, from a Proto-Ugric *mańć- "man, person".

In philosophy
The mixture of serious and tongue-in-cheek self-designation originates with Plato, who on one hand 

Harking back to Plato's  are a number of later descriptions of man as an animal with a certain characteristic. 
Notably animal rationabile "animal capable of rationality", a term used in medieval scholasticism (with reference to Aristotle), and also used by Carl von Linné (1760) and Immanuel Kant (1798).
Based on the same pattern is animal sociale or "social animal"
animal laborans "laboring animal" (Hannah Arendt 1958) and 
animal symbolicum "symbolizing animal" (Ernst Cassirer 1944).

Taxonomy

The binomial name Homo sapiens was coined by Carl Linnaeus (1758).
Names for other human species were introduced beginning in the second half of the 19th century (Homo neanderthalensis 1864, Homo erectus 1892).

There is no consensus on the taxonomic delineation between human species, human subspecies and the human races. On the one hand, there is the proposal that H. sapiens idaltu (2003) is not distinctive enough to warrant classification as a subspecies. On the other, there is the position that genetic variation in the extant human population is large enough to justify its division into several subspecies.
Linneaeus (1758) proposed division into five subspecies, H. sapiens europaeus  alongside H. s. afer, H. s. americanus and  H. s. asiaticus for Europeans,  Africans, Americans and Asians. This convention remained commonly observed until the mid-20th century, sometimes with variations or additions such as H. s. tasmanianus for Australians.
The conventional division of extant human populations into taxonomic subspecies was gradually abandoned beginning in the 1970s.
Similarly, there are proposals to classify  Neanderthals and Homo rhodesiensis as subspecies of H. sapiens, although it remains more common to treat these last two as separate species within the genus Homo rather than as subspecies within H. sapiens.

List of binomial names

The following names mimick binomial nomenclature, mostly consisting of   Homo followed by a Latin adjective characterizing human nature.
Most of them were coined since the mid 20th century in imitation of Homo sapiens in order to make some philosophical point (either serious or ironic), but some go back to the 18th to 19th century, as in Homo aestheticus vs. Homo oeconomicus; Homo loquens is a serious suggestion by Herder, taking the human species as defined by the use of language; 
Homo creator is medieval, coined by Nicolaus Cusanus in reference to man as imago Dei.

In fiction

In fiction, specifically science fiction and fantasy, occasionally names for the human species are introduced reflecting the fictional situation of humans existing alongside other, non-human civilizations.
In science fiction, Earthling (also "Terran", "Earther", and "Gaian") is frequently used, as it were naming humanity by its planet of origin. Incidentally, this situation parallels the naming motive of ancient terms for humanity, including "human" (homo, humanus) itself, derived from a word for "earth" to contrast humans as earth-bound with celestial beings (i.e. deities) in mythology.

See also

Cultural universal
Human self-reflection
Übermensch

References

Further reading
 Luigi Romeo, Ecce Homo!: A Lexicon of Man, John Benjamins Publishing, 1979.

Humans
Human species